Sosnówek Lock - the twelfth lock on the Augustów Canal (from the Biebrza). It combines artificial part of the canal with a section running through the Black Hancza.
Built in 1828 by Lt. Eng. Konstantin Jodko.

 Location: 71.2 km channel
 Level difference: 2.98 m
 Length: 44.40 m
 Width: 6.10 m
 Gates: Wooden
 Year built: 1828
 Construction Manager: Konstantin Jodko

References

 
 
 

19th-century establishments in Poland
Sosnowek